James Sims, Jr. (born February 14, 1983, in Phoenix, Arizona) was an American football running back in the National Football League.  He played college football at the University of Washington.

He was signed by the New York Giants as a rookie free agent on May 13, 2006, and played during the preseason, carrying the ball 33 times for 98 yards.  He signed with the full squad on December 19, 2006.

References

Living people
1983 births
Players of American football from Phoenix, Arizona
American football running backs
Washington Huskies football players
New York Giants players